José Alfredo Botello Montes (born 7 December 1956) is a Mexican politician and lawyer affiliated with the PAN. In the period of 2012–2015 he served as Deputy of the LXII Legislature of the Mexican Congress representing Querétaro. He now serves as Education Secretary in Querétaro's Government

References

1956 births
Living people
People from Querétaro City
National Action Party (Mexico) politicians
Politicians from Querétaro
20th-century Mexican politicians
21st-century Mexican politicians
Autonomous University of Queretaro alumni
Members of the Congress of Querétaro
Deputies of the LXII Legislature of Mexico
Members of the Chamber of Deputies (Mexico) for Querétaro